Pornsawan Plungwech (born 15 January 1973) is a retired Thai badminton player who affiliate with Kasetsart University. She competed in women's singles at the 1992 Summer Olympics in Barcelona, and at the 1996 Summer Olympics in Atlanta.

Career 
Plungwech was part of Thai women's team that won the silver medals at the Southeast Asian Games from 1989 to 1997. She also won bronzes in the singles event in 1991, 1995, 1997, and in the women's doubles in 1995. She had won eleven Thai national championships title, three in the singles event, five in the women's doubles with Somharuthai Jaroensiri, and three in the mixed doubles with Siripong Siripool. She participated at the 1992 and 1996 Summer Olympics, but was eliminated in the third round in both years to Sarwendah Kusumawardhani and Han Jingna respectively.

Plungwech clinched the bronze medal at the 1996 Asian Championships held in Surabaya. She claimed her first and the only international title at the Brunei Open in the women's doubles event partnering with Thitikan Duangsiri. In December, she was invited to compete at the World Cup in Jakarta together with top exponents of the sport from various countries.

Achievements

Asian Championships 
Women's singles

Asian Cup 
Women's doubles

Southeast Asian Games 
Women's singles

Women's doubles

IBF World Grand Prix 
The World Badminton Grand Prix sanctioned by International Badminton Federation (IBF) since 1983.

Women's doubles

References

External links 
 

1973 births
Living people
Pornsawan Plungwech
Pornsawan Plungwech
Badminton players at the 1992 Summer Olympics
Badminton players at the 1996 Summer Olympics
Pornsawan Plungwech
Badminton players at the 1990 Asian Games
Badminton players at the 1994 Asian Games
Pornsawan Plungwech
Competitors at the 1989 Southeast Asian Games
Competitors at the 1991 Southeast Asian Games
Competitors at the 1993 Southeast Asian Games
Competitors at the 1995 Southeast Asian Games
Competitors at the 1997 Southeast Asian Games
Pornsawan Plungwech
Pornsawan Plungwech
Southeast Asian Games medalists in badminton
Pornsawan Plungwech
Pornsawan Plungwech